Apollon Ladies FC is a women's football team from Limassol, Cyprus, established in 2007. It is the leading club in the country, having won nine consecutive doubles. It is associated with men's side Apollon Limassol.

Apollon made headlines after beating two-times European champion Umeå IK in their second appearance in the Champions League. This is regarded as one of the biggest surprises in European women's football. Apollon reached the Round of 32, where it was knocked out by Zvezda Perm. Apollon again progressed past the qualifying stage in the 2011–12, 2012–13 and the 2013–14 season.

Current squad
 As of 31 March, 2022.
 Flags indicate national team as defined under FIFA eligibility rules. Players may hold more than one non-FIFA nationality.

Former internationals
For details of current and former players, see :Category:Apollon Ladies F.C. players.

  Cyprus: Skevi Antoniou, Stavriana Antoniou, Mandalena Christou, Loucretia Chrysostomou, Marilena Georgiou, Eleni Giannou, Maria Ioannou, Antria Michail, Sophia Nearchou, Margarita Sofocleous, Christiana Solomou, Antri Violari, Victoria Zampa

  Bulgaria: Liliana Kostova, Petya Petkova
  England: Lianne Sanderson
  Greece: Danai-Eleni Sidira
  India: Manisha Kalyan
  Jamaica: Tiffany Cameron
  Mexico: Cecilia Santiago
  Netherlands: Marije Brummel
  Poland: Nikki Krzysik
  Portugal: Mónica Mendes
  Romania: Cristina Costa, Teodora Drăgoescu, Mirela Ganea, Olga Iordachiusi, Alexandra Iusan, Eniko Kadar, Andreea Laiu, Corina Olar, Laura Rus, Florentina Spanu, Ana Maria Stanciu
  Russia: Yekaterina Gokhman
  Scotland: Frankie Brown, Ifeoma Dieke, Hayley Lauder
  United States: Danesha Adams, Yael Averbuch, Joanna Lohman, Tina DiMartino

Former non-international professional players
  Michelle Betos, Taylor Comeau, Michelle Cruz, Gina DiMartino, Sinead Farrelly, Kelly Henderson, Haley Kopmeyer, Ashley Nick, Mollie Pathman, Hanna Terry, Zaneta Wyne

UEFA Competitions History

Honours
 Cypriot First Division
 Champions (13): 2008–09, 2009–10, 2010–11, 2011–12, 2012–13, 2013–14, 2014–15, 2015–16, 2016–17, 2018–19, 2020–21, 2021–22, 2022–23
 Cypriot Cup
 Winners (11): 2008–09, 2009–10, 2010–11, 2011–12, 2012–13, 2013–14, 2014–15, 2015–16, 2016–17, 2017–18,  2021–22 
Cypriot Super Cup
 Winners (8): 2009, 2010, 2011, 2013, 2014, 2015, 2017, 2021

References

External links

Women's football clubs in Cyprus
Apollon Limassol
Association football clubs established in 2007
2007 establishments in Cyprus